Bell Green is an area in the London Borough of Lewisham, between Perry Vale and Bellingham. The area was historically known for its gas works and the poverty of the local workers, in what Charles Booth called "the one really poor district in this quarter of London." The gasworks closed in 1968 and the whole area redeveloped; it is best known today for the eponymous retail park.

A map from 1870 shows that Bell Green was predominately a rural area with a small settlement surrounding a road junction.

Gallery

References

Areas of London